HMS Seahorse was a 38-gun Artois-class fifth-rate frigate of the Royal Navy. She was launched in 1794 and broken up in 1819.

Revolutionary Wars
Launched in June 1794, Seahorse was commissioned the following month by Captain John Peyton for the Irish Station.

In July 1796,  and Seahorse took the privateer cutter Calvados (or Salvados). Calvados carried six guns and ten swivels, and had a crew of 38 men. She was ten days out of Brest, France, but had not made any captures.

Joined by Diana, Cerberus and Seahorse captured the 14-gun privateer Indemnité on 28 August. Indemnité, of Boulogne, was pierced for 14 guns but carried ten. She had a crew of 68 men.

On 14 September 1796, Cerberus, Seahorse and  captured the Brazilian ship Santa Cruz.

Seahorse took part in Rear Admiral Nelson's attack on Santa Cruz on 25 July 1797. 

She captured the French frigate Sensible in a minor action on 27 June 1798 in the Strait of Sicily.

She was with Vice-Admiral Hood's squadron off Alexandria in August 1798.

Anemone had left Toulon on 27 July and Malta on 26 August.

Emerald and Seahorse chased Anemone inshore where she anchored in the shallow water, out of reach of the two British frigates. When the frigates despatched boats, Anemone cut her anchor cable and drifted on to the shore. While the Frenchmen were attempting to escape along the coast, unfriendly Arabs captured them and stripped them of their clothes, shooting those who resisted. The commander and seven others escaped naked to the beach where the British, who had swum ashore with lines and wooden casks, rescued them.

Anemone had a crew of 60 men under the command of enseigne de vaisseau Garibou, and was also carrying General Camin and Citoyen Valette, aide de camp to General Napoleon Buonaparte, with dispatches from Toulon, as well as some other passengers. Camin and Valette were among those the Arabs killed.

Seahorse arrived at Portsmouth in October 1799, and returned to the Mediterranean in May 1800 as the flagship of Rear-admiral Sir Richard Bickerton. On the way, in the evening of 4 April, she encountered the merchantman Washington which was sailing form Lisbon to Philadelphia, and which cleared for action. Both parties were able to identify themselves in time.

On 9 September 1801, Seahorse left Portsmouth, escorting a convoy bound for Bengal. The convoy, reached Madeira on 23 September, and left the next day.

Mediterranaean
She was paid off for a first time, in October 1802, and was recommissioned in May 1803. She was in action at Lavandon (Hyeres) 11 July 1804. Her next notable action was against the Turkish vessel Badere Zaffere on 6 July 1808.

His Majesty authorized the issue of a gold medal to Captain Stewart for the action; only 18 battles or actions qualified for such an award. In 1847 the Admiralty authorized the issue of the NGSM with clasp "Seahorse with Badere Zaffere" to all the surviving claimants from the action.

On 10 May 1809, a landing party from Seahorse and Halcyon landed on the small Italian islands of Pianosa and Gianuti. The landing party destroyed the enemy forts and captured about 100 prisoners during four hours of fighting. British losses were one marine killed and one wounded.

On 8 May 1810 Seahorse captured the Neapolitan privateer Stella di Napoleon, of two guns an d40 men.

Ligurie escaped immediately but Seahorse was able to drive Renard ashore and cannonade her there. Even so, Renard was little-damaged and was able to get off after Seahorse had left. Renard limped back to Genoa. En route, Renard again met Seahorse, but sought refugee under the shore batteries of Levanto which, although in bad shape, proved sufficient to deter the Seahorse.

She was paid off for a second time in June 1811, and was under repair at Woolwich from August to October 1812. She was recommissioned in September 1812 under the command of Sir James Gordon. She sank the 16-gun privateer lugger Subtile off Beachy Head on 13 November 1813 after a chase of three hours. The lugger had been so damaged in the chase that she sank before Seahorse could take off her crew. As a result, of her crew of 72 men, all but 28 drowned, her captain, François-David Drosier, and all his officers, among them. She was a few days out of Dieppe and had captured a Swedish brig laden with salt, and a light collier.  was in sight at the time.

War of 1812

Seahorse was off the Atlantic Coast of Northern America in 1814, taking part in an action off the Potomac on 17 August 1814. (John Robyns, Captain of the Royal Marine detachment of HMS Albion, reckoned the Seahorse took £100,000 in prizes. ) In September, she was present at the Battle of Baltimore.

In November, Seahorse was at Pensacola until the arrival of General Andrew Jackson's forces caused the British to depart. Her boats were to participate in the Battle of Lake Borgne. Her officers and crew qualified for the clasps to the Naval General Service Medal that the Admiralty issued in 1847 to all surviving claimants, for the former and latter actions of 17 August 1814 and 14 December 1814 respectively. 

Seahorse stopped off at Prospect Bluff, on the Apalachicola River, to embark 64 Royal Marines. She departed on 15 April 1815, and arrived at Portsmouth on 31 May 1815.

Fate
Seahorse was broken up in July 1819.

Notes, citations, and references
Notes

Citations

References
 
 Brooks, Richard & Little, Matthew. (2008). Tracing Your Royal Marine Ancestors: A Guide for Family Historians - Published in Association with the Royal Marines Museum. Pen & Sword, Barnsley.   pg86
 
 
  (available from page 535 on this PDF file)
Strathern, Paul (2009) Napoleon in Egypt. (Bantam Books Trade Paperbacks). 
 
 

 

Frigates of the Royal Navy
1794 ships
Ships built on the River Thames
War of 1812 ships of the United Kingdom
Artois-class frigates